Ami Assaf (born Ami Vilkomitz; 22 July 1903 – 17 May 1963) was an Israeli politician who served as a member of the Knesset for Mapai from 1949 until 1961.

Biography
Born in Rosh Pinna, Assaf attended Herzliya Gymnasium. After finishing school, he worked in agriculture. One of the founders of the Kfar Yehoshua moshav, in 1936 he became secretary of the Moshavim Movement, and was a member of Mapai's central committee.

In 1949 he was elected to the first Knesset on Mapai's list. He was re-elected in 1951, 1955 and 1959. On 28 December 1959 he was appointed Deputy Minister of Education and Culture. After re-election in 1961 he reprised the role, holding it until his death in 1963. Upon his death, his seat was taken by Mordechai Zar.

References

External links
 

1903 births
1963 deaths
Deputy ministers of Israel
Herzliya Hebrew Gymnasium alumni
Jews in Mandatory Palestine
Mapai politicians
Members of the 1st Knesset (1949–1951)
Members of the 2nd Knesset (1951–1955)
Members of the 3rd Knesset (1955–1959)
Members of the 4th Knesset (1959–1961)
Members of the 5th Knesset (1961–1965)
Moshavim movement secretaries
People from Rosh Pinna